Fanaei is an Iranian surname. Notable people with the surname include:

 Davoud Fanaei (born 1975), Iranian footballer and referee
 Mohammad Fanaei (born 1951), Iranian football referee

Iranian-language surnames